The Kaytago-Tabasaransky okrug was a district (okrug) of the Dagestan Oblast of the Caucasus Viceroyalty of the Russian Empire. The area of the Kaytago-Tabasaransky okrug is included in contemporary Dagestan of the Russian Federation. The district's administrative centre was Madzhalis.

Administrative divisions 
The subcounties (uchastoks) of the Kaytago-Tabasaransky okrug were as follows:

Demographics

Russian Empire Census 
The plurality of the population indicated Dargin to be their mother tongue, with significant Tatar and Kazikumukh speaking minorities.

Kavkazskiy kalendar 

Notes

References

Bibliography 

Okrugs of Dagestan Oblast